Saddleback College (Saddleback) is a public community college in Mission Viejo, California. It is part of the California Community College system and awards over 300 associate degrees, academic certificates, and occupational skills awards in 190 programs.  Established in 1968, Saddleback is the oldest and southernmost institution governed by the South Orange County Community College District. Saddleback College is named for the saddle between the twin peaks of Santiago Peak and Modjeska Peak in the Cleveland National Forest.

Academics
Saddleback College is the largest member of the South Orange County Community College District. The college awards associate degrees (A.A., A.S) and academic certificates in over 100 areas of study. Not-for-credit Community Education classes are also available through Saddleback College.

Saddleback College provides a Veterans Education Transition Services (VETS) Center.  The program is devoted to helping veterans transition from combat to the classroom. VETS supports transitioning combat veterans through an extensive network of care givers in the civilian community, government, and non-profit organizations.

Accreditation
Saddleback College is accredited by the Accrediting Commission for Community and Junior Colleges. The associate degree nursing program is accredited by the National League for Nursing Accrediting Commission and the paramedic program is accredited by the Commission for Accreditation of Emergency Medical Services Programs.

Campus and surroundings

Saddleback College is located in Mission Viejo, Orange County, California.

A notable site on the campus is the Saddleback College Veterans Memorial, which was officially completed in 2010. A dedication ceremony was held on April 29, 2010, and was attended by representatives for Gov. Arnold Schwarzenegger, lawmakers, active and former members of the armed services, college students and staff. This memorial stands as a symbol of sacrifice, freedom and honor on the Saddleback Campus.

An on-campus bus terminal/transfer point for the Orange County Transportation Authority 85, 91, and  MV Shuttle 182 is located on the north end of campus.

Student life
The campus is populated with many student clubs and organizations. The Associated Student Government (ASG) plans, organizes, promotes, sponsors and finances a comprehensive program of activities and services for all Saddleback College students. ASG is made up of three branches which are Inter-Club Council, the Associated Student Senate, Events Cabinet. The Inter-Club Council manages various college clubs that have included the Model United Nations, the Chicano Latino Studies Student Association, College Democrats, College Republicans, Class Action, Students for a Free Tibet, Wilderness Adventure Club, and the Anime Club.

Athletics
Saddleback College is home to 19 intercollegiate athletic teams.

Men's intercollegiate teams
Baseball
Basketball
Cross Country
Football
Golf
Swimming & Diving
Tennis
Track and Field
Water Polo
Women's intercollegiate teams
Basketball
Beach Volleyball
Cross Country
Golf
Fastpitch Softball
Swimming and Diving
Tennis
Track and Field
Volleyball
Water Polo
Soccer
Cheerleading

Media
The Lariat: Since opening in 1968, Saddleback College has had a student-run newspaper, the Lariat. It is distributed most Wednesdays of the regular school year. It is printed at the Anaheim, California, facility of the Orange County Register, where 5,000 copies are made. During the fall 2005 semester, the Lariat chose to change its masthead to include Saddleback's sister college in Irvine, Irvine Valley College, to appeal to a broader reader base and increase circulation. The change was met with opposition from members of Saddleback's administration as well as from the Associated Student Government since Irvine Valley College did not contribute funds to the Lariat. Irvine Valley College now gives an allotted sum and the masthead continues to include both colleges. The Lariat was a National Newspaper Pacemaker winner in 1994 and a finalist in 1993, 1997, 2005, and 2006.
KSBR Saddleback Radio: KSBR is a commercial-free jazz radio station broadcast throughout the LA area on the HD2 secondary channel of 88.5fm. This is done via a partnership with KCSN whose audio appears on 88.5's primary channel. KSBR's format is contemporary jazz but it also has weekend specialty shows featuring other musical styles like reggae, folk, ragtime, rock, Latin jazz, blues, and hip-hop.

In addition to training Saddleback College's Communication Arts students, KSBR has received the Associated Press "Instant News" citation, AP's Certificate of Excellence for overall coverage, and is the only California station to be a four-time winner of the American Heart Association's C. Everett Koop, M.D. award.

Saddleback College Television: Cox Communications Cable Television - Saddleback College - Channel 39 - Mission Viejo

Saddleback College Cable Television serves cable subscribers with educational and school based programming from all of Saddleback's public and private educational institutions.

Notable people

Alumni

Heather C. Allen, research chemist
Colt Brennan, Oakland Raiders quarterback
Mike Bullock, writer
Anthony Carter, Denver Nuggets point guard
Richard Crawford, NFL player, drafted by Washington Redskins 2012
Deborah Driggs, Playboy Playmate of the Month for March 1990, once married to gymnast Mitch Gaylord
Barbara Edwards, Playboy Playmate of the Month for September 1983 and Playboy Playmate of the Year for 1984
Kevin Fagan, creator of Drabble comic strip
Cade Gaspar, Major League Baseball pitcher
Mark Grace, Major League Baseball first baseman
Brandon Hammond, actor
Yolanda Hughes-Heying, IFBB professional bodybuilder
Bill Kenney, former football player and politician
Kyle Long, football player for the Kansas City Chiefs. Formerly with the Chicago Bears
 Kevin Magee (1959–2003), basketball player
Ben Maller, sports radio personality and Internet sports columnist
Stephone Paige, former NFL wide receiver
Chris Parker, American football player
Kasey Peters, American football player
Mike Piel, played for the University of Illinois, and in the NFL for the Los Angeles Rams from 1989 to 1992.
Nick Punto, Major League Baseball infielder
Chris Sulages, American football coach
Bob Thornton, forward for the New York Knicks and current assistant coach for the Minnesota Timberwolves
 Ashley Wagner (born 1991), figure skater
Menelik Watson, Offensive Tackle for the Oakland Raiders
Tim Wallach, Major League Baseball third baseman
Victor Webster, Canadian actor
Gregory Widen, screenwriter and director
 Sandun Wijemanne Nissanka, Music & Tech Entrepreneur. Current Group CEO of the music distribution franchise, Bonfire Distribution Inc.

Faculty
Jonelle Allen, Actress-(Generations - Dr. Quinn,  Medicine Woman), Singer, Dancer, Director
Amy Sterling Casil (born 1962), science fiction writer
John Cederquist (born 1946), American sculptor
Simon Arkell (born 1966), Olympic pole vaulter / entrepreneur
Helen Feyler-Switz (1925–2006), artist, sculptor

References

External links

Official website

 
Universities and colleges in Orange County, California
California Community Colleges
Educational institutions established in 1968
Schools accredited by the Western Association of Schools and Colleges
Mission Viejo, California
Two-year colleges in the United States